The Seruvila Polling Division is a Polling Division in the Trincomalee Electoral District, in the Eastern Province, Sri Lanka.

Presidential Election Results

Summary 

The winner of Seruvila has matched the final country result 6 out of 8 times. Hence, Seruvila is a Weak Bellwether for Presidential Elections.

2019 Sri Lankan Presidential Election

2015 Sri Lankan Presidential Election

2010 Sri Lankan Presidential Election

2005 Sri Lankan Presidential Election

1999 Sri Lankan Presidential Election

1994 Sri Lankan Presidential Election

1988 Sri Lankan Presidential Election

1982 Sri Lankan Presidential Election

Parliamentary Election Results

Summary 

The winner of Seruvila has matched the final country result 5 out of 7 times. Hence, Seruvila is a Weak Bellwether for Parliamentary Elections.

2015 Sri Lankan Parliamentary Election

2010 Sri Lankan Parliamentary Election

2004 Sri Lankan Parliamentary Election

2001 Sri Lankan Parliamentary Election

2000 Sri Lankan Parliamentary Election

1994 Sri Lankan Parliamentary Election

1989 Sri Lankan Parliamentary Election

Demographics

Ethnicity 

The Seruvila Polling Division has a Sinhalese plurality (62.2%), a significant Moor population (19.7%) and a significant Sri Lankan Tamil population (15.9%) . In comparison, the Trincomalee Electoral District (which contains the Seruvila Polling Division) has a Moor plurality (41.8%), a significant Sri Lankan Tamil population (30.7%) and a significant Sinhalese population (26.7%)

Religion
The Seruvila Polling Division has a Buddhist plurality (61.0%), a significant Muslim population (20.0%) and a significant Hindu population (11.9%) . In comparison, the Trincomalee Electoral District (which contains the Seruvila Polling Division) has a Muslim plurality (42.0%), a significant Buddhist population (26.2%) and a significant Hindu population (25.9%)

References

Polling Divisions of Sri Lanka
Polling Divisions of the Trincomalee Electoral District